Izvestia (alternative transliteration: Izvestiya, Izvestija) may refer to:

Izvestia, a Russian newspaper
Novye Izvestia, a Russian newspaper, founded by former journalists of Izvestia
Izvestia (horse), a racehorse
Izvestija Trophy, an ice hockey tournament held in the Soviet Union
Izvestiya: Mathematics, a mathematical journal